The following is a list of Malayalam films released in 1966.

1966
Malayalam
 1966
1966 in Indian cinema